Betanzos is a surname.

Notable people with this name include
 Domingo Betanzos, (?-1549) was a Spanish Dominican missionary to Central America
 Juan de Betanzos (1510–1576), wrote one of the most important sources on the conquest of the Incan civilization, Narrative of the Incas
 Miguel Betanzos (1962-), an Argentine novelist
 Odón Betanzos (1925–2007), a Spanish poet, novelist, literary critic and professor
 Pedro de Betanzos (?-1570), a Spanish Franciscan missionary and linguist.
 Yoandri Betanzos (1982-), a Cuban athlete competing in the triple jump.